Sullivan is a city in Moultrie County, Illinois, United States. The population was 4,413 at the time of the 2020 census. It is the county seat and largest city of Moultrie County. Sullivan is named after Sullivan's Island, South Carolina, where Fort Moultrie is located.

History

Sullivan was founded in 1845 as Asa's Point. Two years after Sullivan was founded, the first official courthouse of the county was built. It was a simple two-story brick building with a hipped roof, and the county jail was housed in the basement. The village would come alive with gossip when court was in session. Abraham Lincoln passed through this first courthouse many times from 1849 to 1852 as he practiced law in the Moultrie County circuit court. The present courthouse (the county's third) contains a mural depicting this first courthouse. 

In the opinion of early local leaders, Sullivan was not a logical site for a county seat. The village of Nelson (which no longer exists) had already been developed, and the prairie on which Sullivan would be built lacked proper drainage and was a breeding ground for malaria-carrying mosquitoes. In 1844, however, it was determined that centrally-located Sullivan was to be the county seat.

The original village consisted of 40 acres (25 city blocks) bounded by Jackson Street on the north, Water Street on the south, Douglas (now Worth) Street on the East, and Hamilton Street on the west. Sullivan's first school was built in 1846, with the first church being built in 1848.

When Abraham Lincoln was campaigning for the state senate against Stephen A. Douglas, he gave a speech in Freeland Grove (now the Sullivan Civic Center parking lot). Freeland Grove was bounded by Wyman Park, Main Street, Strain Street, and Worth Street..There is now a small monument commemorating Lincoln's 1858 speech that faces Wyman Park near Main Street. During this campaign, a riot broke out on the town square between the supporters of Lincoln and the supporters of Douglas.

In 1864, a fire destroyed the first courthouse and a second, larger one was built that was in use until 1904, when it was demolished and the third, present-day courthouse was built. Along with the first courthouse building, hundreds of county records were lost.

Sullivan was also home to the Titus Opera House, built in 1871, which was located on the north side of the town square. On the second and third floors of the building, the large auditorium, balcony, and box seats could accommodate up to 800 patrons. The opera house was among the finest in the area, and it hosted a concert given by the great Venezuelan pianist Teresa Carreño. The opera house was built by a businessman and Civil War veteran named Joseph Titus as both an attraction for high society and a “playground” for his young daughter, Winifred. Winifred Titus grew up to become a talented pianist and singer. Titus toured Europe during her career, even performing at the legendary Palais Garnier in Paris. In the early morning of February 20, 1910, the Titus Opera House caught fire and tragically burned to the ground. This marked the end of a live entertainment era in Sullivan until Guy S. Little Jr. founded The Little Theatre on the Square decades later.

Wyman Park, one of two parks on the north side of Sullivan, has an intriguing past. Albert Wyman, a man who immigrated to the United States from Germany, owned a shoe repair and sales shop on the west end of the town square. During the time Wyman was alive, Sullivan lacked a public park, so in his will he endowed much of his business profit to the city in order to purchase land for a park. While Wyman's will prohibited any kind of sales from occurring on the grounds of the new park, concession stands were built next to the baseball diamonds in the 1960s.

The Moultrie County Historical and Genealogical Society, formerly located in downtown Sullivan, now on the southern end of town on South Hamilton Street, houses a small museum of the county's past.

Geography

Demographics

As of the census of 2000, there were 4,326 people, 1,820 households, and 1,188 families residing in the city. The racial makeup of the city was 98.68% White, 0.30% African American, 0.12% Native American, 0.16% Asian, 0.09% from other races, and 0.65% from two or more races. Hispanic or Latino of any race were 0.39% of the population.

There were 1,820 households, out of which 28.3% had children under the age of 18 living with them, 51.8% were married couples living together, 10.4% had a female householder with no husband present, and 34.7% were non-families. 31.0% of all households were made up of individuals, and 16.5% had someone living alone who was 65 years of age or older. The average household size was 2.28 and the average family size was 2.84.

In the city the population was spread out, with 22.8% under the age of 18, 8.3% from 18 to 24, 25.9% from 25 to 44, 21.3% from 45 to 64, and 21.7% who were 65 years of age or older. The median age was 40 years. For every 100 females, there were 84.4 males. For every 100 females age 18 and over, there were 81.2 males.

The median income for a household in the city was $33,197, and the median income for a family was $41,894. Males had a median income of $31,754 versus $20,631 for females. The per capita income for the city was $17,693. About 5.4% of families and 8.8% of the population were below the poverty line, including 9.3% of those under age 18 and 8.9% of those age 65 or over.

Economy
Sullivan is home to several companies. Agri-Fab and Hydro-Gear have their corporate headquarters located in Sullivan along with factories. Sullivan is also home to Metro Communications and the First Community Bank of Moultrie County which first started in 1905 as a national bank under the name of First National Bank of Sullivan.

Education
Sullivan is home to Sullivan Community Unit School District 300 the sports teams have the name  "Redskins."

The official school song is Northwestern University's "Go Northwestern," and the fight song is entitled "Hail Red and Black." The school fight song has lyrics written by a Sullivan High School alumnus, but the music was composed by Dr. Paul Van Buskirk Yoder, a notable composer, arranger, and band director of the twentieth century.

Points of interest

The Little Theatre on the Square
The Little Theatre on the Square in Sullivan is a non-profit; it received $20,000 from President Barack Obama's 2009 economic stimulus package,. In 2013, it received $23,200 from the Illinois Arts Council for general operating expenses.

Abraham Lincoln Memorial
When Abraham Lincoln was campaigning for senate against Stephen A. Douglas, he gave a speech on September 20, 1858, in Freeland's Grove (now Wyman Park), and today there is a monument commemorating his speech at the approximate location.

Huntsburger Hood Ornament Collection
A sample of the 700+ vintage hood ornaments of Lynn Huntsburger's collection, located in the board room of the Elizabeth Titus Memorial Library.

Ward Museum
The Ward Museum at Mason Point, a nursing home just east of Sullivan, displays a collection of items collected from around the world by the Ward family, including one of the largest collections of seashells in the nation. The Ward's collection went on display in 1948, and the collection has remained intact since then. It was featured on an episode of the TV show "Illinois Adventure." The museum was established by Abraham Lincoln "Link" Ward, a farmer, livestock dealer, and auctioneer as well as his wife, Cora Anne (Hinterly) Ward. In addiitoin to seashells, the museum contains over 1,000 pieces of antique glassware, including 400 antique goblets. Frontier life items include wooden wheel clocks, circa 1830, copper-toed shoes, spinning wheels, and broad axes. The museum was established in 1948; Cora Ward died in 1967, and the executor of her estate burned the catalog compilation, so the origin of the over 5,000 items donated by the couple, who travelled widely, is unknown.

Nixon rally and buffalo burger
During the 1960 United States presidential election, then-Vice President Richard Nixon held a campaign rally in Sullivan. He discarded a half-eaten buffalo burger that was the product of the slaughter of buffalo owned by the City of Sullivan and housed at their street maintenance facility. The discarded burger was retrieved by Sullivan resident Steve Jenne, who preserved it. Jenne exhibited the burger on The Tonight Show Starring Johnny Carson in 1988 and was a guest on I've Got a Secret in 2006.

Notable people
 Albert J. Beveridge, American historian and US senator
 Steve Buxton, NFL football player
 Gregory Cochran, physicist, anthropologist, and writer
 William Granville Cochran, Illinois state judge and legislator
 John R. Eden, attorney and U.S. Representative
 Tiny Hill, bandleader
 R. Eden Martin, American lawyer
 Samuel W. Moulton, attorney and U.S. Representative
 Gary Noffke, artist, raised in Sullivan
 Harold Pogue, football player
 Art Schwind, Major League Baseball player, 1912
 William Irving Shuman, businessman and politician
 Douglas Wilson, interior designer on Trading Spaces; former owner of Doug Wilson's Jibby's

References

External links
Visitor's guide
History of Moultrie County and Sullivan, Illinois

Cities in Moultrie County, Illinois
County seats in Illinois
Cities in Illinois